CMT Australia is an Australian cable and satellite music television channel owned and operated by Paramount Networks UK & Australia. It is the third and currently only country music video channel in Australia, created after the closure of MusicCountry from the Australian market, followed by its predecessor network.

From 2004 until June 2020, it was known as Country Music Channel and was owned by Foxtel Networks. Foxtel ceased that network's operations (along with sister channels [V], MAX and Foxtel Smooth) at the end of June 2020 as part of a long-term agreement with Paramount Global to program new music networks on its platform. The channel is now a localised version of the US Country Music Television, and airs country music videos around the clock from Australia and globally.

Former CMC-era programming 

 The CMC Top 30 Countdown - weekly chart based on airplay
 Spotlight, one-hour collection of videos from a single artist.
 30 Best - themed countdown.
 Headline Country
 The Wilkinsons (TV series)
 Tuckerville
 Rollin' With... - an artist profile show host by Steve Forde. artists profiled include Lee Kernaghan, Catherine Britt, Adam Brand, Troy Cassar-Daley, Joe Nichols, Dierks Bentley, Corb Lund Band, Blaine Larsen, Miranda Lambert, Jack Ingram, Colt Ford and The Wilkinsons
 Muster Masters - a game show hosted based around the Gympie Muster (2009)

Talent 
Steve Forde (Rollin' with...)
The Sunny Cowgirls (Muster Masters, CMC Rocks the Hunter)
Morgan Evans

Live events 
CMC co-produced a three-day music festival, with Rob Potts Entertainment Edge and Michael Chugg Entertainment - CMC Rocks.
The first three years the event took place in Thredbo, New South Wales.
In 2008, CMC Rocks the Snowys featured Mia Dyson, Brian Cadd, John Butler Trio, Shea Fisher, The McClymonts, Jim Lauderdale, Catherine Britt, Steve Forde, Adam Harvey, Shannon Noll, Sugarland, Gary Allan, and Patty Griffin.  
In 2009, CMC Rocks the Snowys featured Corb Lund and the Hurtin' Albertans, Steve Forde, Captain Flange, Taylor Swift, Joe Nichols, Old Crow Medicine Show, John Williamson, Pete Murray, The Waifs, The Sunny Cowgirls, Ash Grunwald, The Audreys, Jasmine Rae, and Deana Carter.
In 2010, CMC Rocks the Snowys featured Adam Harvey, Nanci Griffith, Tania Kernaghan, Steve Forde, Phil Vassar, Jack Ingram, Lee Kernaghan.
In 2011, the event moved to the Hunter Region of New South Wales and featured Troy Cassar-Daley, Russell Morris, Alan Jackson, Joe Nichols, Emerson Drive, Dean Brody.

In partnership with parent company Foxtel, CMC hosted its own awards program which it airs live. The CMC Awards took place on the night until CMC Rocks officially starts.

References

External links

2020 establishments in Australia
Australian country music
Music video networks in Australia
English-language television stations in Australia
Television channels and stations established in 2020
Foxtel